The Mortlock Football League is an Australian rules football competition based around 8 clubs in the south-west region of Western Australia. It is one of a number of football leagues in the wheat-belt region of WA. The eight teams represent the towns of Calingiri, Dalwallinu, Dowerin, Gingin, Goomalling, Toodyay, Wongan-Ballidu. Wyalkatchem played until the end of 2010.

Mortlock League also includes a hockey competition which involves all clubs mentioned above. Teams compete in a home and away season of 14 rounds with a number of byes and one week during the season dedicated to playing country week football against other south-western country leagues. The season ends with a finals campaign including the top 4 teams from the home and away rounds. Notable players that have been recruited from their respected towns to AFL teams include; Josh and Matthew Carr (Goomalling), Lance Franklin (Dowerin), Willie Dick (Goomalling, Ballidu), Brendan Fewster (Gingin), Mal Brown (Dowerin). Retired AFL players to have previously/currently played in the Mortlock Football League are; Michael Pettigrew, Ashley Sampi, Antoni Grover, Kepler Bradley, Greg Broughton.

History

The Mortlock Football League's origins date back to the formation of the Goomalling-Dowerin Association in 1923, although organised football had been played in the district since 1904.

The Goomalling Football Association was formed at a meeting held in the Goomalling Agricultural Hall on 28 May 1904. Representatives from Dowerin, Goomalling and Mumberkine were present and the district was divided into three wards from which the teams would select their players. E. F. Edwardes was elected as President and H. Slater took on the role of Secretary. Mumberkine were premiers in the Association’s inaugural season.  The Oak Park club was formed in 1905, but their lifespan proved to be a short one.

Goomalling were premiers in 1905 and 1906, before hotel proprietor T. F. Elliott provided a cup for the premier side in the Association. The 1907 season saw Dowerin, Goomalling and new side Rovers (Goomalling) compete for the Elliott Cup. Rovers, donning the colours of yellow and black, drew their players from the north side of the Goomalling-Dowerin Railway line and played at the Oak Park ground.

The known results for the 1907 season saw Goomalling defeat Rovers before Rovers later exacted revenge with a 34-point win, Goomalling overcame Dowerin, 6.9 to 3.6, Rovers outclassed Dowerin, 6.13 to 1.3, Dowerin beat Goomalling by 6.7 to 5.8 and Goomalling edged out Rovers, 5.8 to 4.6.

At the end of the season, Goomalling and Rovers were equal on points, so a play-off was scheduled, with Rovers triumphant by 13 points, 4.10 to 3.3. Captain Herb Slater and Black Tommy, both outstanding players and goal scorers, played key roles in Rovers taking out the premiership.

In 1908, Rovers were premiers once again when they defeated Goomalling by five points to retain the Elliott Cup. A derby match in July saw some 500 people in attendance as Rovers defeated Goomalling by 11 points.

In 1909, W.A.F.L. club East Perth were the guests of the Goomalling Association for a match in the region on August 21, with the visitors running out narrow 4.10 to 3.15 winners. The local competition saw Rovers achieve a hat-trick of premierships after a solid 9.10 to 4.9 win over Goomalling in the decider.

Despite good coverage of football throughout the state, the West Australian provided virtually no coverage of the 1910 Goomalling Association season. It is known, however, that Rovers won their fourth consecutive flag.

The Goomalling Association made the journey to Perth for a return fixture with East Perth in 1910. In a one-sided contest played at Loton Park, East Perth were comfortable 44 point winners, 12.12 to 5.10. Later in the season, the Goomalling Association met the Eastern Districts Association at Northam and, in wet conditions, the home side prevailed 5.8 to 1.3.

The 1911 season was rocked by the disqualification of the Rovers club on 20 July, following the off-field actions of some members of the club, including a clique supposedly led by Herbert Slater and ‘Gunner’ Hills, who ‘attempted to run the Goomalling Football Association and endeavoured to bully members of the committee into letting them have their sweet way.’ The season continued with just two clubs, with Goomalling proving far too strong for Dowerin and were crowned premiers.

The 1912 season saw the admission of the Wanderers (Goomalling) to restore a three-team competition. The Wanderers players were chiefly Karranadgin settlers, and the team chose to wear the colours of red, white and blue. Dowerin won the premiership in this season, which by now was the F. L. Rose Cup.

In 1912, The Goomalling Association wrote to the W.A.F.L. in 1912, suggesting the staging of a Country Week competition. Unfortunately, the Association was unable to raise a  representative side, leaving Avon, Bunbury, Geraldton, Moora and Nelson as the first teams to participate in this competition.

In 1913, Goomalling lost only two matches all season en route to securing the premiership, ‘icing the cake’ with a 5.16 to 4.4 win over Dowerin in the Final.

In 1914, the Country Week competition included eight teams – Bunbury, Forrest, Geraldton, Goomalling, Moora, Quairading, South Suburban and Warren. The Final saw an upset six point victory for Forrest over Goomalling, 6.12 to 6.6.

The W.A.F.L. affiliated associations in 1914 were Albany, Arthur West, Bunbury, Central District, Central Murchison, Collie, Forrest, Geraldton, Goomalling, Katanning, Moora, Meekatharra, Narrogin, Nelson, South Suburban, Upper Chapman, Warren and the W.A.F.A.

There was virtually no reference to the Association in the West Australian in 1914, but it is known that Dowerin were premiers after a comprehensive 13.25 to 3.2 win over Goomalling.

The onset of the First World War meant that football was set aside until later in the decade.

In the first five seasons after World War I, five different associations were formed

1919 - Central Districts FA (Goomalling, North Jennacubbine, South Jennacubbine)
1920 - Goomalling-Dowerin-Jennacubbine FA (Dowerin, Goomalling, Jennacubbine)
1921 - Goomalling FA (Goomalling, Karranadgin, Konnongorring)
1922 - Central Districts FA (Australs, Jennacubbine, Jennapullin, Rovers)

The Goomalling-Dowerin Association was formed in 1923 and has remained intact since then (apart from a three-season World War II recess from 1942-1944). Jennacubbine won the first two premierships.

The Association was renamed as the Goomalling & Districts Association in 1925 (11 years after its predecessor disbanded) and this competition was conducted until 1941, when World War 2 forced the cessation of the competition for three seasons from 1942 to 1944.

The competing clubs from 1923 to 1941 were: Dowerin (1923-1924, 1933-1941), Goomalling (1926), Goomalling Australs (1923, 1927-1941), Goomalling Country (1925), Goomalling Rovers (1923, 1927-1941), Goomalling Town (1925 - withdrew mid season), Jennacubbine (1923-1926; 1928-1941), Konnongorring (1927; 1930; 1932-1937), Mumberkine (1932-1937), North Goomalling (1924), South Goomalling 1924), Toodyay Rangers (1931) and Wongan Hills (1925-1926; 1928-1930; 1936-1940). Rovers were the standout performers with 6 premierships, Australs, Dowerin and Jennacubbine all won 4 premierships and Wongan Hills were premiers in the inaugural season in 1925.

1923 Jennacubbine
1924 Jennacubbine
1925 Wongan Hills
1926 Jennacubbine

1927 Rovers
1928 Australs
1929 Rovers
1930 Australs

1931 Rovers
1932 Rovers
1933 Australs
1934 Jennacubbine

1935 Australs
1936 Rovers
1937 Dowerin
1938 Dowerin

1939 Dowerin
1940 Dowerin
1941 Rovers

The G&DFA resumed in 1945, with five clubs (Dowerin, Ejanding, Goomalling, Konnongorring and Wongan Hills) affiliating. In 1973, the league changed its name to the Mortlock National Football League.

The affiliated clubs since World War 2 have been: Ballidu (1961-1995), Bolgart (1958-1976), Cadoux (1967-1970), Calingiri (since 1959), Dalwallinu (since 1992), Dowerin (1945-2012), Dowerin/Wyalkatchem (since 2013), Ejanding (1945-1962), Gingin (since 1973), Goomalling (since 1945), Jennacubbine (1946-1971), Konnongorring (1945-1948; 1954-1975), Toodyay (since 1960), Wongan/Ballidu (since 1996), Wongan Hills (1945-1995), Wyalkatchem (1955-1957; 1976-2010) and Yerecoin (1959).

In 1973, with the inclusion of Gingin the association changed its name to the Mortlock National Football League.

The most well-known players to come out of the MFL are four-time All-Australian Jack Clarke (ex-Jennacubbine) and the legendary Mal Brown (ex-Dowerin), as well as VFL/AFL players Eric 'Tarzan' Glass (ex-Goomalling), Willy Dick (ex-Goomalling and Ballidu), brothers Josh and Matthew Carr (ex-Goomalling), Brendon Fewster (ex-Gingin) and arguably today's highest profile player in four-time All-Australian Lance Franklin (ex-Dowerin).

Seven players have played at VFL/AFL level and 95 players have been recruited to the WAFL from current MFL clubs. Players to have played 50 or more WAFL games are Laurence Watson (Bolgart), Mal Brown, Ronald Brown, Murray Couper and Ian Newman (Dowerin), Brendon Fewster (Gingin), Gary Brookes, Willy Dick, Eric Glass and Charles Western (Goomalling), Jack Clarke (Jennacubbine), Anthony Beattie and Chester Mackean (Toodyay) and Ron Bayens (Wongan Hills).

The League receives good promotion in the local media and season 2014 sees the return of live football broadcasts of MFL matches after an absence of many years, thanks to Frontier Sports Media. Their weekly 'Mortlock Matchday' broadcasts can be heard via www.frontiersportsmedia.com as a live audio stream and via the TuneIn radio app.

Current clubs

Former clubs

Grand final results

Fairest and best (Boekeman Medal) 

League
Known as Jones Medal in the mid 1950's, Mortlock Medal in the 1970s and Boekeman Medal since 1991

Reserves

Player of the year (Bendigo Bank Award)
2007 Craig Wilson (Dowerin)
2008 Dean Trewhella (Dowerin)
2009
2010 Brad McNeill (Dalwallinu)
2011 Rheece Bartel (Gingin)
2012 Rheece Bartel (Gingin)

Leading goalkicker (Lyndon Bird Award) 

League

2000
2001
2002
2003 Justin Kiely (Wyalkatchem) 62 goals
2004 Phil Brookes (Dalwallinu) 62 goals
2005 Daniel King (Calingiri)
2006 Michael Potts (Gingin) 83 goals
2007 Samuel Stanton (Toodyay)76 goals
2008 Jay Betts (Toodyay) 87 goals
2009 David Wilson (Dowerin) 62 goals
2010 David Wilson (Dowerin) 56 goals
2011 Geoffrey Rouse (Gingin) 83 goals
2012 Geoffrey Rouse (Gingin) 99 goals
2013 Geoffrey Rouse (Gingin) 101 goals

Ladders

2011 ladder 
																		
																		
Finals

2012 ladder

2013 ladder

2014 ladder

2015 ladder

2016 ladder

2017 ladder

References

External links

 Full Points Footy

Australian rules football competitions in Western Australia